Queensberry Bay is a town in Great Kei Local Municipality in the Eastern Cape province of South Africa.

References

Populated places in the Great Kei Local Municipality